The Seventh Municipality (In Italian: Settima Municipalità or Municipalità 7) is one of the ten boroughs in which the Italian city of Naples is divided.

Geography
The municipality is located in the north-eastern suburb of the city and borders with Casoria, Casavatore and Arzano.

Its territory includes the zones of Ponti Rossi and Capodichino, seat of Naples Airport.

Administrative division
The Seventh Municipality is divided into 3 quarters:

References

External links
 Municipalità 7 page on Naples website

Municipality 07